The William L. White Jr. House is a historic house located at 242 Winthrop Street in Taunton, Massachusetts.

Description and history 
This -story, wood-framed house was built in 1873 by William L. White for his son. The Whites were prominent local carriage builders. The house is locally significant as one of the city's largest and most elaborate examples of the Second Empire style of architecture, adorned with a flared mansard roof decorated in patterned slate, and a wraparound porch supported by clustered Tuscan columns.

The house was listed on the National Register of Historic Places on July 5, 1984.

See also
National Register of Historic Places listings in Taunton, Massachusetts

References

National Register of Historic Places in Taunton, Massachusetts
Houses in Taunton, Massachusetts
Houses on the National Register of Historic Places in Bristol County, Massachusetts
Second Empire architecture in Massachusetts
Houses completed in 1873